Dirk Vekeman (25 September 1960 – 5 May 2013) was a Belgian football player.

Club career
He came through the youth ranks at R.S.C. Anderlecht and played 35 matches for their senior team. He was their second goalkeeper for several years behind Nico De Bree and then Jacky Munaron, before season-long spells at fellow Brussels teams Racing Jet and RWDM. He finished his career at F.C. Boom, with whom he clinched promotion to the Eerste klasse in 1992.

Honours

Player 

 Anderlecht

 Belgian First Division: 1980–81, 1984–85, 1985–86, 1986–87
 Belgian Supercup: 1985, 1987
 UEFA Cup: 1982–83 (winners), 1983–84 (runners-up)
 Jules Pappaert Cup: 1983, 1985
 Bruges Matins: 1985

FC Boom 

 Belgian Second Division: 1991–92

References

External links
 Obituary - K Rupel Boom FC

1960 births
2013 deaths
People from Uccle
Association football goalkeepers
Belgian footballers
R.S.C. Anderlecht players
Racing Jet Wavre players
R.W.D. Molenbeek players
K. Rupel Boom F.C. players
Belgian Pro League players
Footballers from Brussels